The Dominican Republic Open (also known as The DR Open) was a men's professional golf tournament currently hosted on PGA Tour Latinoamérica.

The event was originally hosted as a combined amateur stableford and professional stroke play competition by The Dominican Golf Federation in 2010 and 2011.

In 2012, the tournament was announced as an event on the inaugural PGA Tour Latinoamérica season and the focus of the event was shifted towards the professional stroke play, although the pro–am format was retained.

Winners

References

External links
Coverage on the PGA Tour Latinoamérica official site

PGA Tour Latinoamérica events
Golf tournaments in the Dominican Republic
Pro–am golf tournaments
Summer events in the Dominican Republic
Recurring sporting events established in 2010
Recurring sporting events disestablished in 2020
2010 establishments in the Dominican Republic
2020 disestablishments in the Dominican Republic